Centella is a genus of 53 species of flowering plants in the subfamily Mackinlayoideae. The genus is sometimes placed in family Araliaceae; however, recent studies utilising molecular data place Centella within Apiaceae.

Species 

 Centella abbreviata (A. Rich.) Nannf.
 Centella affinis (Eckl. & Zeyh.) Adamson
 Centella annua M.Schub. & B.-E.van Wyk
 Centella asiatica (L.) Urb.
 Centella brachycarpa M.Schub. & B.-E.van Wyk
 Centella caespitosa Adamson
 Centella calcaria M.Schub. & B.-E.van Wyk
 Centella callioda (Cham. & Schltdl.) Drude
 Centella capensis (L.) Domin
 Centella cochlearia (Domin) Adamson
 Centella comptonii Adamson
 Centella cordifolia (Hook.f.) Nannf.
 Centella coriacea Nannf.
 Centella cryptocarpa M.T.R.Schub. & B.-E.van Wyk
 Centella debilis (Eckl. & Zeyh.) Drude
 Centella dentata Adamson
 Centella didymocarpa Adamson
 Centella difformis (Eckl. & Zeyh.) Adamson
 Centella dolichocarpa M.Schub. & B.-E.van Wyk
 Centella erecta (L.f.) Fernald
 Centella eriantha (A.Rich.) Drude
 Centella flexuosa (Eckl. & Zeyh.) Drude
 Centella fourcadei Adamson
 Centella fusca (Eckl. & Zeyh.) Adamson
 Centella glabrata L.
 Centella glauca M.Schub. & B.-E.van Wyk
 Centella graminifolia Adamson
 Centella gymnocarpa M.T.R.Schub. & B.-E.van Wyk
 Centella laevis Adamson
 Centella lanata Compton
 Centella lasiophylla Adamson
 Centella linifolia (L.f.) Drude
 Centella linifolia var. depressa Adamson
 Centella longifolia (Adamson) M.T.R.Schub. & B.-E.van Wyk
 Centella macrocarpa (A.Rich.) Adamson
 Centella macrodus (Spreng.) B.L.Burtt
 Centella montana (Cham. & Schltdl.) Domin
 Centella obtriangularis Cannon
 Centella pilosa M.Schub. & B.-E.van Wyk
 Centella pottebergensis Adamson
 Centella recticarpa Adamson
 Centella restioides Adamson
 Centella rupestris (Eckl. & Zeyh.) Adamson
 Centella scabra Adamson
 Centella sessilis Adamson
 Centella stenophylla Adamson
 Centella stipitata Adamson
 Centella ternata M.Schub. & B.-E.van Wyk
 Centella thesioides M.Schub. & B.-E.van Wyk
 Centella tridentata (L.f.) Drude ex Domin
 Centella tridentata var. dregeana (Sond.) M.Schub. & B.-E.van Wyk
 Centella tridentata var. hermaniifolia (Eckl. & Zeyh.) M.Schub. & B.-E.van Wyk
 Centella tridentata var. litoralis (Eckl. & Zeyh.) M.Schub. & B.-E.van Wyk
 Centella triloba (Thunb.) Drude
 Centella umbellata M.Schub. & B.-E.van Wyk
 Centella villosa L.
 Centella villosa var. latifolia (Eckl. & Zeyh.) Adamson
 Centella virgata (L.f.) Drude

References

Mackinlayoideae
Apiaceae genera